"Lightning Bolt" is a song by English singer-songwriter Jake Bugg. It was released on 27 April 2012 in the United Kingdom via digital download, the third from his self-titled debut studio album Jake Bugg (2012).

Released as a single on 24 December 2012, it reached No. 26 in the UK Singles Chart in the week beginning 13 January 2013. It was Bugg's first UK Top 40 single and remains one of his biggest hits and more recognisable songs.

Style and content
The "lightning bolt" of the title represents a sudden and unexpected situation in which the singer finds himself, a burst of fortunate events. The chorus describes the singer as someone who takes everything that has been put on his plate for him: "I just stand by and I wait my time". But he will take the chance when it comes his way: "when I see the signs I jump on that lightning bolt". He doesn't want to be one of those people who "walk with gritted teeth" and "toe the line", those who don't take chances and believe there aren't any answers.

The lightning bolt could also represent love at first sight:
"Met her as the angels parted for her
She only brought me torture
That’s what happens
When it’s you that's standing in the path of a lightning bolt."
So by "taking chances" the listener could assume "taking chances in love".

The song has been described as "reminiscent of early Beatles hits" and "was likened to Buddy Holly, Johnny Cash and early Dylan." Writing for the Sabotage Times, Joe Mardon says:
It chugs along with a quick acoustic beat matched by an instantly classic vocal delivery of fast paced lyrics, recalling "Subterranean Homesick Blues". You know straight away that Bugg's got something and repeat the song, twice last night, a further three times this morning. The smile returns every time.

Quick research reveals that Jake Bugg, bred on one of the UK's largest council estates in Nottingham, has only just turned eighteen. It's a fact that is, quite frankly, ridiculous.

He's a wordsmith in the Dylan sense of the word, painting pictures of the estate he grew up in, and the hope of getting out.

Music video
An accompanying music video, lasting two minutes and thirty seconds, was first released on YouTube on 18 May 2012. By September 2017 it had received over 15 million hits.

The video was shot in Amsterdam, Netherlands, with some scenes in Brussels, Belgium, and was directed by Michael Holyk, who also directed the video for Bugg's "Trouble Town".

In popular culture
The song gained prominence in the UK after it was used as the backing-track to a recording of the 100m win by Usain Bolt at the 2012 London Olympics. Interviewed in October 2012 on BBC Radio Nottingham, Bugg confirmed that the song "had no relevance to the Olympics", but that he thought "it was great that they used it".

In April 2013 Bugg performed the song live at the offices of Billboard'

In 2019 the song was featured in the show Lucifer'', during the fourth episode of season four.

Track listings

Musicians
Iain Archer: guitar, drums
Jake Bugg: vocal, guitar

Charts and certifications

Weekly charts

Year-end charts

Certifications

Release history

References

External links
Jake Bugg: Lightning Bolt at discogs.com

2012 singles
Jake Bugg songs
Songs written by Iain Archer
Songs written by Jake Bugg
2011 songs
Mercury Records singles